Pasadena Hills is a city in St. Louis County, Missouri, United States. The population was 930 at the 2010 census. The entire city is listed on the National Register of Historic Places.

Geography
Pasadena Hills is located at  (38.707451, -90.292179).

Demographics

2010 census
As of the census of 2010, there were 930 people, 433 households, and 273 families living in the city. The racial makeup of the city was 28.1% White, 68.3% African American, 0.4% Native American, 1.0% Asian, 0.4% from other races, and 1.8% from two or more races. Hispanic or Latino of any race were 1.2% of the population.

There were 433 households, of which 21.7% had children under the age of 18 living with them, 45.3% were married couples living together, 12.5% had a female householder with no husband present, 5.3% had a male householder with no wife present, and 37.0% were non-families. 31.9% of all households were made up of individuals, and 10.9% had someone living alone who was 65 years of age or older. The average household size was 2.15 and the average family size was 2.67.

The median age in the city was 50.4 years. 16.3% of residents were under the age of 18; 4.6% were between the ages of 18 and 24; 19.9% were from 25 to 44; 40.3% were from 45 to 64; and 18.8% were 65 years of age or older. The gender makeup of the city was 46.3% male and 53.7% female.

2000 census
As of the census of 2000, there were 1,147 people, 460 households, and 316 families living in the city. The racial makeup of the city was 29.99% White, 67.39% African American, 0.17% Native American, 0.52% Asian, 0.09% from other races, and 1.83% from two or more races. Hispanic or Latino of any race were 0.87% of the population.

There were 460 households, out of which 29.8% had children under the age of 18 living with them, 51.1% were married couples living together, 14.8% had a female householder with no husband present, and 31.1% were non-families. 25.7% of all households were made up of individuals, and 6.7% had someone living alone who was 65 years of age or older. The average household size was 2.48 and the average family size was 3.02.

In the city, the population was spread out, with 22.5% under the age of 18, 6.8% from 18 to 24, 27.6% from 25 to 44, 32.4% from 45 to 64, and 10.7% who were 65 years of age or older. The median age was 41 years. For every 100 females, there were 79.8 males. For every 100 females age 18 and over, there were 75.7 males.

The median income for a household in the city was $83,438, and the median income for a family was $91,354. Males had a median income of $77,500 versus $52,596 for females. The per capita income for the city was $48,065. There were .7% of families and 1.0% of the population living below the poverty line, including 1.4% of under 18 and 4.1% of those over 64.

References

Cities in St. Louis County, Missouri
Cities in Missouri